August von Pelzeln (10 May 1825, Prague – 2 September 1891 in Oberdöbling) was an Austrian ornithologist. He was a grandson to novelist Karoline Pichler (1769-1843).

He studied at the University of Vienna, later working as an assistant under helminthologist Karl Moriz Diesing (1800-1867) in the Hof-Naturalien-Cabinet (from 1851). In 1857 he acquired curatorial duties formerly held by Johann Jakob Heckel (1790-1857), and subsequently became in charge of the bird (1857) and mammal (1869) collections. He worked on the birds collected by Johann Natterer in Brazil (343 species).

He was forced to retire from the museum due to ill health, and died at Oberdöbling near Vienna.

Some birds described by Pelzeln are the orange-breasted thornbird, the spot-winged antbird, the red-legged tinamou, the white-throated tinamou, the short-billed leaftosser, the yellow-margined flatbill and the New Zealand rockwren.

His name is associated with Pelzeln's tody-tyrant (Hemitriccus inornatus). Gustav Hartlaub (1814-1900) named the Madagascar grebe (Tachybaptus pelzelnii) in his honor; Otto Finsch (1839-1917) named the Pohnpei starling (Aplonis pelzelni) after Pelzeln.

Works
 Bemerkungen gegen Darwin's Theorie vom Ursprung der Spezies. Vienna: A. Pichler Witwe & Sohn (1861).
 Zur Ornithologie Brasiliens, Resultate von Johann Natterers Reisen in den Jahren 1817 bis 1835, Johann Natterer, Wien, A. Pichler's Witwe & Sohn (1868- 1870 3 volumes). BHL
 Beiträge zur Ornithologie Südafrikas (1882) - Contributions to the ornithology of southern Africa.
 Many papers in "Sitzungsberichte der Kaiserliche Akademie der Wissenschaften in Wien" (usually abbreviated Sitz.K.Akad.Wiss.Wien).

References

zobodat.at, obits include bibliography

External links 
 Google Search (publications by August von Pelzeln)

Austrian untitled nobility
Austrian ornithologists
1825 births
1891 deaths
Scientists from Prague
University of Vienna alumni
Austrian civil servants
Members of the German Academy of Sciences Leopoldina